The Col. Gideon Morgan House is a historic house in Kingston, Tennessee.

Description and history 
The -story house was built from 1810 to 1813. It was designed in the Federal architectural style. It has been listed on the National Register of Historic Places since January 27, 1983.

References

Houses on the National Register of Historic Places in Tennessee
Federal architecture in Tennessee
Houses completed in 1813
Houses in Roane County, Tennessee
National Register of Historic Places in Roane County, Tennessee